Mario Šoštarič (born 25 November 1992) is a professional handball player who plays for SC Pick Szeged. Born in Slovenia, he has represented both Slovenia and Croatia internationally.

Šoštarič started his career with RK Gorenje Velenje, and later played for RK Maribor Branik.

Honours
SC Pick Szeged
 Hungarian Championship: 2017–18, 2020–21, 2021–22
 Hungarian Cup: 2018–19

References

External links

1992 births
Living people
Sportspeople from Slovenj Gradec
Slovenian male handball players
Croatian male handball players
Expatriate handball players
Slovenian expatriate sportspeople in Hungary
Croatian expatriate sportspeople in Hungary
SC Pick Szeged players
21st-century Slovenian people